Vermont Route 7A (VT 7A) is a  north–south state highway in Bennington County, Vermont, in the United States. It is an alternate route of U.S. Route 7 (US 7) between Bennington and Dorset. The route is signed as "Historic VT 7A" to distinguish it, the original routing of US 7, from the modern US 7 limited-access highway.

Route description

VT 7A begins at the southern end of the US 7 limited-access highway in Bennington. It heads northwest on Northside Drive for roughly six blocks, then turns north to follow the Ethan Allen Highway at the southern terminus of VT 67A. Upon passing under VT 279, VT 7A begins to parallel US 7. The two routes eventually reconnect by way of the Bennington North State Highway before US 7 veers off to the northeast. VT 7A, meanwhile, continues north into Shaftsbury.

Just inside Shaftsbury, VT 7A passes by the Robert Frost Stone House Museum. The route continues north to the village of South Shaftsbury, where it meets VT 67. North of the village, VT 7A curves slightly to the northeast as it enters Arlington. Here, the route travels past the Norman Rockwell Gallery and Exhibition and overlaps with VT 313. Outside of the village of Arlington, VT 7A takes on a more pronounced northeasterly routing into Manchester. The route passes near Hildene and serves the historic site by way of Hildene Road, then continues on to Manchester Center. Here, VT 7A intersects VT 11 and briefly overlaps VT 30 before exiting the village and entering the town of Dorset, where the route ends at another junction with US 7. Some drivers prefer VT 7A over the nearby four-lane US 7 freeway during the winter because it is significantly lower in elevation (up to  lower than the freeway at points), so driving conditions are generally better during storms.

History
The route is called "Historic" in order to avert confusion with the two to four-lane limited-access highway routing of US 7, known locally as the "Super 7". Before the limited-access highway opened, VT 7A was the original routing of US 7.

Major intersections

References

External links

007A
Transportation in Bennington County, Vermont
U.S. Route 7